Joseph Henry Dawes (born 29 August 1970) is an Australian cricket coach and former player. He played for the Queensland Bulls in Australian domestic cricket as a right-arm fast bowler.

He spent much of his early career in and out of the side due to the success of Michael Kasprowicz, Andy Bichel and Adam Dale. In 2001–02 he enjoyed his first full season when Kasprowicz got injured and Bichel returned to the Test side. He cemented his spot in the side and was a regular until a career ending knee injury in 2005. He finished as Queensland's eighth-highest wicket-taker of all time with 238 victims at 24.94 from his 64 matches. His best season with the Bulls came in 2001–02 with 49 wickets, topping the Pura Cup wicket tally. 43 and 46 wickets came in his next few seasons as he helped Queensland to claim back-to-back titles.

He has also played cricket at Middlesex and for the Marylebone Cricket Club.

In February 2012 he was appointed as the bowling coach of the India national cricket team. He replaced Eric Simons.

In March 2018, Dawes was appointed the head coach of the Papua New Guinea national cricket team. He vacated the role in March 2021.

References

External links

1970 births
Living people
Australian cricketers
Queensland cricketers
Middlesex cricketers
Cricketers from Brisbane
Marylebone Cricket Club cricketers
Indian Premier League coaches
Coaches of the Papua New Guinea national cricket team
Australian expatriates in Papua New Guinea